Moana is a genus of cicadas in the family Cicadidae. There are at least four described species in Moana.

Species
These four species belong to the genus Moana:
 Moana aluana (Distant, 1905) c g
 Moana expansa Myers, 1928 c g
 Moana novaeirelandicae (Duffels, 1977) c g
 Moana obliqua (Duffels, 1977) c g
Data sources: i = ITIS, c = Catalogue of Life, g = GBIF, b = Bugguide.net

References

Further reading

 
 
 
 

Cosmopsaltriini
Cicadidae genera